Cornucopianism is the idea that continued progress and provision of material items for mankind can be met by similarly continued advances in technology. It relies on the belief that there is enough matter and energy on the Earth to provide for the population of the world, which appears adequate to give humanity almost unlimited room for growth.

The term comes from the cornucopia, the "horn of plenty" of Greek mythology, which magically supplied its owners with endless food and drinks.  Adherents are called "cornucopians" or sometimes "boomsters", in contrast to doomers, whose views are more aligned with Malthusianism."

Theory

As a society becomes more wealthy, it also creates a well-developed set of legal rules to produce the conditions of freedom and security that progress requires.

In Progress and Poverty written in 1879, after describing the powerful reproductive forces of nature, the political economist Henry George wrote, "That the earth could maintain a thousand billions of people as easily as a thousand millions is a necessary deduction from the manifest truths that, at least so far as our agency is concerned, matter is eternal and force must forever continue to act."

Julian Simon was one of the best known cornucopian thinkers in modern times who suggested in his book, The Ultimate Resource, published in 1981, that humans have always found a way in the past to develop and enhance past resources over virtually any roadblock. He suggested that while resources may come and go, the knowledge that can come from a bigger population, and thus more manpower/intellect, humanity would continuously be able to find newer sources of energy. Simon did argue however that in order for humans to seek innovation and new sources of energy, free markets must be present to place value on sources of energy through their price to produce and use. Once the price of a certain resource become too high due to lack of supply, it would encourage new research into alternative sources to seek cheaper energy.

Description by an opposing view

Stereotypically, a cornucopian is someone who posits that there are few intractable natural limits to growth and believes the world can provide a practically limitless abundance of natural resources.  The label 'cornucopian' is rarely self-applied, and is most commonly used derogatorily by those who believe that the target is overly optimistic about the resources that will be available in the future.

One common example of this labeling is by those who are skeptical of the view that technology can solve, or overcome, the problem of an exponentially-increasing human population living off a finite base of natural resources.  Cornucopians might counter that human population growth has slowed dramatically, and not only is currently growing at a linear rate, but is projected to peak and start declining in the second half of the 21st century. However, more recent projections have the global population rising to 11 billion by 2100 with continued growth into the next century. Furthermore, it always has in the past, even when population was increasing at a far faster rate.

Criticism
Lindsey Grant accuses cornucopians, especially Julian Simon and Herman Kahn, of making arguments with logical flaws, omissions and oversights and of making assumptions and choosing methodologies that ignore or dismiss the most critical issues.

See also
Ibn Khaldun
Albert Allen Bartlett
Candide
William R. Catton Jr.
Food security
Jacque Fresco
John McCarthy
Julian Simon and Simon–Ehrlich wager
Matt Simmons
Ron Arnold
Post-scarcity economy
RethinkX
Innumeracy

References

Further reading
 William R. Catton, Jr, "The Problem of Denial" Environment & Society, 1994.
 Frank J. Tipler, "There Are No Limits To The Open Society" Critical Rationalist, Vol. 3, No. 2, September 23, 1998. -- expresses cornucopian views, e.g. "The laws of physics as we presently understand them place no ultimate limits to growth. The wealth of society can grow to become literally infite at the end of time."
 Ernest Partridge, "Perilous Optimism", 2007, gadfly.igc.org -- a criticism of Simon and Sagoff; "Prof. Simon's ideas have been universally dismissed by environmental scientists as crackpot, and yet he was something of a hero among libertarians, neo-classical economists, and their political disciples."
 cornucopian, britannica.com
 Cornucopian | Saving Earth, britannica.com
 Food, Future of: A History, encyclopedia.com
 Neo-Malthusians and Cornucopians put to the test: Global 2000 and The Resourceful Earth revisited by Jonathan Lee Chenoweth and Eran Feitelson, 2005
 Wikiversity:History of cornucopian thought

Sustainability